Sussex Merlins are a rugby league team playing in the London and South division of the Rugby League Conference. They are based in Brighton, East Sussex.

History
Sussex Merlins were founded in May 2009 by Chairman Nick Weston aimed at re-introducing rugby league into Sussex. Their first season in the London League saw them win three out of their six games. In October, Merlins' Director of Sport, James Szymik, was shortlisted and highly commended in the Brighton and Hove City Sports Awards.

For the 2010 season, Sussex Merlins joined the Rugby League Conference. They also added a minis section, the Mini Merlins, with squads at under-9 and under-7.

For the 2012 season, Sussex Merlins will once again play in the South East Division against Southampton, Portsmouth, Guildford, Greenwich and Medway. James Szymik will continue as head coach supported by Assistant Coaches Tom Lemehaute, Toby Pumfrey, Charlie Mears and Ben Messmer. Kurt Butler has been named as captain. Under-7s and under-14s teams were added to the roster.

2012 Saw the club reach their first final, unfortunately losing to St Ives rosters.

2013 The Club had a fantastic start to the season, even beating Portsmouth Navy team, who hadn't lost in the league for 2 years. Seeing the Merlin's make the playoffs for the first time.

2014 was a big year for the club, introducing Women's rugby league to their roster. Headed up by Former Nottingham outlaw, Lucy Simpson and under the watchful eye of first team player Charlie Mears. The team Won the Brighton 9's festival amongst other great results for a first season.

2015 The club has expanded further with Steve Jones now running an u15's as well as many other youth ages progressing. Former first team captain Kurt Butler and the experienced Kieran Robertson are set to take charge of the First team as head coach's. Their first game in charge is set to be a preseason friendly against the Army. Charlie Mears has been named as head coach for the women's team and both teams will look to be challenging at the Brighton bier 9's festival in June.

References

Sport in Brighton and Hove
Rugby League Conference teams
Rugby clubs established in 2009
Rugby league teams in Sussex